Alexander of Macedon may refer to:

Alexander I of Macedon (died 454 BC), ruled from 498 to 454 BC
Alexander II of Macedon (died 368 BC), ruled from 370 to 368 BC
Alexander III of Macedon (356–323 BC), or Alexander the Great, ruled from 336 to 323 BC
Alexander IV of Macedon (323–310 BC), ruled as a child-king from birth to death
Alexander V of Macedon (died 294 BC), ruled with his brother Antipater from c. 297–294 BC
Alexander (son of Perseus), a child in the 160s